J. Alvin Christopher, is a politician who presently serves as leader of the People's Empowerment Party in the British Virgin Islands.  He is not currently a member of the House of Assembly, but was the longstanding elected member for the second district, a position which he held from the 1995 general election until the 2015 general election.

Alvin Christopher was first elected to office as an independent in 1995.  Shortly afterwards he was offered the position of Minister of Communication and Works, and joined the governing Virgin Islands Party (VIP).  After the 1999 general election he "crossed the floor" to join the opposition National Democratic Party (NDP).  In May 2006 Mr Christopher was removed from his position as Minister of Communications and Works by the NDP, and at the next meeting of the legislative council he crossed the floor for a second time to sit once again with the opposition VIP (although not formally joining them as a party).  This second move was believed to be related to differences of opinion in relation to the Telecommunications Bill 2006 and telecoms liberalisation programme in the British Virgin Islands generally, although all parties refused to confirm this at the time. Mr Christopher subsequently ran successfully as an independent in the 2007 general election, and was returned with a handsome majority.  By the 2011 general election Mr Christopher had formally rejoined the VIP.

In March 2014 Mr Christopher announced he was joining a newly formed political party, the People's Empowerment Party (or PEP) as Chairman which he would lead into the 2015 general election, and declared himself "fit" to be Premier.  In the end the PEP was crushed in the 2015 general election, winning no seats, and Christopher lost his seat in the House.  Christopher was philosophical about his defeat, and vowed not to quit politics.

Christopher has been linked in the media with the new "Progressives United" party formed by Julian Fraser for a possible run in the 2019 election.

Electoral history

Offices

References

External links 
 https://web.archive.org/web/20140331103246/http://alvinchristopher.com/
 http://www.bvi.org.uk/government/alvinchristopher

British Virgin Islands politicians
Living people
National Democratic Party (British Virgin Islands) politicians
Virgin Islands Party politicians
People's Empowerment Party (British Virgin Islands) politicians
Year of birth missing (living people)